Alexandre Ferreira (born 13 November 1991) is a Portuguese professional volleyball player. He is a member of the Portugal national team. At the professional club level, he plays for Fenerbahçe İstanbul.

His brother, Marco Ferreira is also a professional volleyball player.

Honours

Clubs
 National championships
 2011/2012  Portuguese Championship, with SC Espinho 
 2013/2014  Italian SuperCup, with Diatec Trentino

Individual awards
 2018: FIVB Challenger Cup – Best Server
 2018: FIVB Challenger Cup – Best Spiker

References

External links

 
 Player profile at LegaVolley.it 
 Player profile at PlusLiga.pl 
 Player profile at Volleybox.net

1991 births
Living people
People from Seia
Sportspeople from Guarda District
Portuguese men's volleyball players
Portuguese expatriate sportspeople in Italy
Expatriate volleyball players in Italy
Portuguese expatriate sportspeople in Turkey
Expatriate volleyball players in Turkey
Portuguese expatriate sportspeople in South Korea
Expatriate volleyball players in South Korea
Portuguese expatriate sportspeople in Poland
Expatriate volleyball players in Poland
Trentino Volley players
Ziraat Bankası volleyball players
Blu Volley Verona players
Gumi KB Insurance Stars players
Warta Zawiercie players
Fenerbahçe volleyballers
Outside hitters